Héctor Gabriel Romero (born 5 January 1994) is an Argentine professional footballer who plays as a midfielder for Atlético Macachín.

Career
Romero, who had a spell in River Plate's academy, started off with All Boys. His debut appearance arrived on 6 December 2014 as the club won away to Sarmiento, with the midfielder appearing for seventy minutes at the Estadio Eva Perón; he had previously been an unused substitute twice in the preceding October, including for the home fixture with Sarmiento. Having not featured in the subsequent 2015 Primera B Nacional season, Romero departed on loan in January 2016 to Juventud Antoniana of Torneo Federal A. He scored his first senior goal in May during a victory over Defensores de Belgrano.

Juventud Antoniana extended his loan in June 2016 to keep him with the Salta outfit until mid-2017, prior to playing in seven fixtures in 2017–18 back with All Boys in Primera B Nacional. After spending one more campaign with All Boys, in Primera B Metropolitana due to relegation in 2017–18, Romero departed in mid-2019 and subsequently joined Villa Mengelle of Liga Cultural. In early 2020, Romero moved to Torneo Regional Federal Amateur side Atlético Macachín.

Career statistics
.

References

External links

1994 births
Living people
Sportspeople from Salta Province
Argentine footballers
Association football midfielders
Primera Nacional players
Torneo Federal A players
Primera B Metropolitana players
All Boys footballers
Juventud Antoniana footballers